Rogers Park is a Metra commuter railroad station in the Rogers Park neighborhood on the north side of Chicago. It is located at 7000 N. Ravenswood Avenue, between W. Greenleaf Avenue and W. Lunt Avenue. In Metra's zone-based fare system, Rogers Park is in zone B. As of 2018, Rogers Park is the 26th busiest of Metra's 236 non-downtown stations, with an average of 1,393 weekday boardings. The neighborhood that surrounds the station is residential, with single-family houses and small apartment buildings, but just a block to the east is Clark Street, a major north-south artery with buses and shopping.

The station has two side platforms, and although it does not contain a ticket agent booth, a small heated waiting room is available on the Lunt side between 5:00 AM - 11:00 AM. This line retains the "left-hand main" policy of the original builder, the Chicago and North Western Railway: northbound trains stop on the west platform and southbound trains stop on the east platform.  

Rogers Park is served by Metra's Union Pacific North Line trains, traveling between Ogilvie Transportation Center in Chicago and points as far north as Kenosha, Wisconsin. Travel time to Ogilvie is usually 20 minutes, but can be as fast as 15 minutes on a rush hour express train and as slow as 23 minutes during overcrowding.

As of April 25, 2022, Rogers Park is served by all 35 trains in both directions on weekdays, by 11 trains in each direction on Saturdays, and eight trains in each direction on Sundays. During the summer concert season, the extra weekend train to  also stops here.

The closest CTA Red Line station is Morse, located five blocks to the east of Rogers Park station.

Bus connections
CTA
  22 Clark (Owl Service)
  96 Lunt (Weekdays only)

References

External links

Lunt Avenue entrance from Google Maps Street View
Greenleaf Avenue entrance from Google Maps Street View

Metra stations in Chicago
Former Chicago and North Western Railway stations
Railway stations in the United States opened in 1890
Union Pacific North Line